The Taurion, as it is known in Haute-Vienne, or Thaurion, as it is known in Creuse, is a 107.5 km long river in western France, tributary of the Vienne river.

Its source is at an altitude of 785 m on the Plateau de Millevaches, on the flanks of the Puy de Groscher, near Gentioux in the commune of Gentioux-Pigerolles, in the Creuse département.

It passes under the bridge of Sénoueix, feeds the Lac de Lavaud-Gelade, before crossing the Rigole du diable. It flows into the Vienne on the right bank at Saint-Priest-Taurion, at 232 m elevation. Hydro-electric dams are built along the river, (La Roche Talamy, l'Étroit, Saint-Marc, Chauvan).

The Taurion flows through the following départements and towns:

Creuse: Gentioux-Pigerolles, Saint-Hilaire-le-Château, Pontarion, Bourganeuf
Haute-Vienne: Saint-Priest-Taurion

References

Rivers of France
Rivers of Nouvelle-Aquitaine
Rivers of Creuse
Rivers of Haute-Vienne